Mawra Hussain (born 28  September 1992) Known professionally as Mawra Hocane is a Pakistani actress and model who primarily works in Urdu television. She made her acting debut in 2011 with A-Plus's serial Khichari Salsa. Hocane is best known for portraying Nadia in Ek Tamanna Lahasil Si, Haya in Aahista Aahista and Anaya in Sabaat.    

In 2016, She made her Bollywood debut with Radhika Rao's romantic drama Sanam Teri Kasam opposite Harshvardhan Rane. Hocane made her Pakistani film debut in 2018 with Nadeem Baig's Comedy drama Jawani Phir Nahi Ani 2.

Life and career 
Hocane changed the spelling of her family name from "Hussain" to "Hocane" in 7th-grade class to give it a unique spelling. 

She holds a degree in law from the University of London which she finished after returning to school.

She performed as a theater artist before working as a VJ at ARY Musik. Hocane performed in the Pakistani television serial dramas Aahista Aahista, Ik Tamanna Lahasil Si and Nikhar Gaye Gulab Sare. She made her Hindi film debut in the Indian romance film, Sanam Teri Kasam, opposite Harshvardhan Rane.

She made her debut in the Pakistani film industry with Jawani Phir Nahi Ani 2.

In December 2018 she modelled in Pantene Hum Bridal couture week. She showcased golden bridal couture for designer Nilofer Shahid. She was the show stopper for designer HSY creation. 

She narrated and appeared in the period drama Aangan, on Hum TV. She also portrayed the role of Sunehri in Daasi and Anaya in Sabaat.

In June 2019 she launched her clothing line in collaboration with her sister Urwa Hocane.

Controversy 

Hocane once tweeted about the Indian film Phantom, which was banned in Pakistan, prompting social media harassment.

Filmography

Awards and nominations

References

External links 
 

Living people
1992 births
People from Karachi
People from Islamabad
Pakistani film actresses
Pakistani television actresses
Pakistani female models
Actresses in Urdu cinema
Actresses in Hindi cinema
Pakistani expatriate actresses in India
Alumni of University of London Worldwide
VJs (media personalities)
21st-century Pakistani actresses